The 2014 Nebraska Cornhuskers football team represented the University of Nebraska in the 2014 NCAA Division I FBS football season. The team was coached by Bo Pelini and played their home games at Memorial Stadium in Lincoln, Nebraska. They were members of the West Division of the Big Ten Conference. They finished the season 9–4, 5–3 in Big Ten play to finish in a tie for second place in the West Division. Following losses to both Wisconsin and Minnesota and a come from behind win in overtime at Iowa, Pelini was relieved of his coaching duties following the conclusion of the regular season on November 30, 2014. On December 4, 2014, Mike Riley was announced as the next head coach of the Nebraska football team, and would begin his duties immediately. However, he would not coach the Huskers in the Holiday Bowl, with that job instead handled by Barney Cotton. The Cornhuskers lost the Holiday Bowl to USC.

Before the season

Recruiting

Scholarship recruits

Walk-on recruits

Schedule

Roster and coaching staff

Depth chart

Game summaries

Florida Atlantic

Source:

Nebraska opened the 2014 season, the 125th season in program history, with a home game against the Florida Atlantic Owls.  Nebraska dominated the game and led from start to finish in a 55–7 rout.  The Huskers ended the game with a Big Ten Conference record 784 yards of total offense, while allowing just 200 total yards to FAU. Nebraska now leads the all-time series with FAU 2–0.

Florida Atlantic Game starters

McNeese State

Source:

Nebraska struggled with FCS opponent McNeese State. Running back Ameer Abdullah broke five tackles on a 58-yard touchdown reception with 20 seconds remaining in the game to lead Nebraska to a 31–24 win at Memorial Stadium. The Huskers totaled 437 yards in offense and allowed 338 to the Cowboys. Tommy Armstrong was 16-of-31 for 242 yards with 2 TDs and an INT passing, and was also the leading rusher with 11 carries for 131 yards and a score. Abdullah added 54 yards rushing with a touchdown on the ground and was the top receiver with three catches for 96 yards and the game-winning score. Jordan Westerkamp added four catches for 61 yards and a TD.  

McNeese State Game starters

Fresno State

Source:

This was Nebraska's first road game of the 2014 season, taking on the Fresno State Bulldogs in Fresno, California.  The two teams had only met once before, a 42–29 Nebraska win in Lincoln in 2011.  Nebraska gained 562 yards of offense and never trailed in a 55–19 win over Fresno State. Tommy Armstrong threw for 260 yards and Ameer Abdullah rushed for 110 to lead the Huskers to a 3–0 start on the season.  For the first time since 2007, Nebraska wore all-white uniforms whereas Fresno State wore alternate all-red ones.

Fresno State Game starters

Miami (FL)

Source:

Nebraska hosted the Miami Hurricanes in game four of the 2014 season.  This was the 11th meeting in the all-time series which was tied at five wins apiece.  It was the first regular season meeting between the two since a 17–9 Nebraska win in 1976. The first meeting between the two took place in 1951 was the first-ever night game at Memorial Stadium. The Gotham Bowl matchup was Nebraska's first-ever bowl victory. Each of the past five bowl meetings for the two saw the winner declared the national champion. Nebraska won 41–31 making it the 400th win in Memorial Stadium history.  The tunnel walk before the game featured the 1994 team including former Nebraska coach Tom Osborne to commemorate the 20th anniversary of defeating Miami for the national championship.

Miami Game starters

Illinois

Source:

Nebraska opened up Big Ten play with a game against Illinois at home on Homecoming.  The Huskers improved to 9–2–1 all-time against the Illini behind the rushing of Ameer Abdullah who put up 196 yards in the first half and 208 total yards and three touchdowns.  The Huskers rushed for over 400 yards as a team en route to a dominating 45–14 victory.  Nebraska broke out their "Red Rising" alternate uniforms from Adidas in this game. During the halftime performance, Nebraska's marching band spelled out "Fear Ameer" on the field.

Illinois Game starters

Michigan State

Source:

19th-ranked Nebraska traveled to East Lansing, Michigan to take on #10 Michigan State in a key Big Ten conference matchup. Heading into the game Nebraska was 7–1 all-time against the Spartans, with MSU picking up their first ever win over Nebraska last year in Lincoln by a score of 41–28. In the game Michigan State jumped out to a 27–3 lead going into the fourth quarter before the Huskers rallied with a 19-point final quarter. Nebraska was driving with the ball with less than a minute to go before throwing a game-ending interception to lose the first game of the year 27–22.

Michigan State Game starters

Northwestern

Source:

19th-ranked Nebraska traveled to Evanston, Illinois, to take on the Northwestern Wildcats in a Big Ten West Division match-up. Coming into the game Nebraska led the all-time series with the Wildcats five games to two. Last year the Huskers captured a 27–24 victory on a last second Hail Mary touchdown pass.  This year's game the two teams played even through two quarters of football before Nebraska pulled away in the second half. Ameer Abdullah recorded a career-high four TDs as the Huskers pulled out a 38–17 victory.  Once again, Nebraska wore all white uniforms for this game while Northwestern wore alternate ones for Homecoming.

Northwestern Game starters

Rutgers

Source:

Nebraska returned home for the first time in four weeks as the Huskers hosted Big Ten newcomer Rutgers.  This was the first ever visit to Memorial Stadium by the Scarlet Knights, and was just the second all-time meeting between the two programs.  The only other meeting came back in 1920, with the Huskers prevailing 28–0 at the New York Polo Grounds.  The 94-year gap between games in the series is the longest for Nebraska against any opponent in school history.

In the matchup, Ameer Abdullah rushed for 225 yards and set a single-game school record with 341 all-purpose yards and scored three TDs to lead Nebraska to a 42–24 win over the Scarlet Knights.  Abdullah now has 6,604 career all-purpose yards, extending his school record and moving  past Ohio State's Archie Griffin into second place in Big Ten history.  Also, wide receiver Kenny Bell became Nebraska's career receptions leader with 167.  

Rutgers Game starters

Purdue

Source:

Purdue visited Memorial Stadium for the first time in program history on Saturday, November 1, 2014.  Nebraska came away with a 35–14 victory in a game that saw Heisman Trophy candidate Ameer Abdullah suffer a knee injury early in the game that knocked him out of the contest.  

Purdue Game starters

Wisconsin

Source:

Nebraska traveled to Madison, Wisconsin to take on the Wisconsin Badgers in a key Big Ten West Division game on Saturday.  Melvin Gordon ran for a new FBS single-game rushing record 408 yards. The Badgers scored 56 unanswered points after the Huskers started the game with a 17–3 lead to win the contest and the inaugural Freedom Trophy by a 59–24 score.

Wisconsin Game starters

Minnesota

Source:

Nebraska completed its 2014 home schedule when Minnesota came to Memorial Stadium on Saturday, November 22 for Senior Day.  The Golden Gophers lead the all-time series 30–22–2, and Nebraska leads 2–1 since joining the Big Ten Conference.  The Gophers overcame a 14-point halftime deficit to defeat Nebraska for the second straight season and clinch a winning Big Ten season for the first time since the 2003 season with a 28–24 win.  

Minnesota Game starters

Iowa

Source:

Kenny Bell caught a 9-yard TD pass in overtime as Nebraska rallied to beat Iowa 37–34 in the Heroes Game on Black Friday.  The Huskers trailed at one point 24–7 before starting their comeback.  The game featured turnovers, big special teams play and stretches of solid defense.  Nebraska improves to 3–1 against Iowa since joining the Big Ten and 29–13–3 overall.  

Iowa Game starters

Holiday Bowl

Source:

Nebraska traveled to San Diego to take on the USC Trojans in the Holiday Bowl.  This was the fifth all-time meeting with the Trojans, but the Huskers have never won in this series, with USC leading all-time 0–3–1 before the game.  The Huskers nearly came back from an 18-point second half deficit, but the Trojans prevailed 45–42.  Nebraska was led by interim-coach Barney Cotton in this contest.

USC Game starters

Big Ten Players of the Week
 Week 1: Ameer Abdullah (Offensive Player of the Week)
 Week 2: Sam Foltz (Special Teams Player of the Week)
 Week 3: De'Mornay Pierson-El (Special Teams Player of the Week)
 Week 4: Ameer Abdullah (Co-Offensive Player of the Week)
 Week 5: Ameer Abdullah (Offensive Player of the Week)
 Week 9: Ameer Abdullah (Offensive Player of the Week)
 Week 14: Nate Gerry (Defensive Player of the Week)
 Week 14: De'Mornay Pierson-El (Co-Special Teams Player of the Week)

All-Conference honors
2014 Big Ten All-Conference honors:

All-Americans
All-America Teams:

RB – Ameer Abdullah (CBS Sports – 2nd Team | Walter Camp – 2nd Team | Athlon Sports – 2nd Team | AP – 2nd Team | Scout – 2nd Team | SI – 2nd Team | Phil Steele – 3rd Team)

RET – De'Mornay Pierson-El (USA Today – 2nd Team | Athlon Sports – 3rd Team | SI – 2nd Team | Sporting News – 2nd Team | FWAA – 2nd Team | Phil Steele – 2nd Team)

DE – Randy Gregory (AP – 3rd Team | FWAA – 2nd Team | Phil Steele – 2nd Team)

NFL Draft
 Ameer Abdullah (2nd Round, 54th pick, Detroit Lions)
 Randy Gregory (2nd Round, 60th pick, Dallas Cowboys)
 Kenny Bell (5th Round, 162nd pick, Tampa Bay Buccaneers)

Rankings

References

Nebraska
Nebraska Cornhuskers football seasons
Nebraska Cornhuskers football